Brachycythara turrita, is an extinct species of sea snail, a marine gastropod mollusk in the family Mangeliidae.

Description

Distribution
This extinct marine species can be found in Miocene strata of the Chotawhatchee Formation of Florida, USA.

References

External links
 Worldwide Mollusk Species Data Base: Brachycythara turrita
 Florida Museum: Image of Brachycythara turrita

turrita